Sarkkinen is a Finnish surname. Notable people with the surname include:

Esco Sarkkinen (1918–1998), American football player and coach
Hanna Sarkkinen (born 1988), Finnish politician

Finnish-language surnames